Railway stations in Mozambique include:

Towns served by railways 
(The lines do not all connect, or connect indirectly)

Northern system 

(northernmost) (CDN) (from west to east)
 Nayuchi -  Malawi - border town.
 Malema - way station
 Ribaue
 Nampula - workshops
 Metocheria
 Gelo
 Monapo - junction
 Nachicuva River
 Nacala - deep water port

 Monapo - junction
 Lumbo - port

 Cuamba - junction to Lichinga
 Lichinga - railhead

 (location unknown)
 Namialo concrete sleeper plant.

(isolated line)
 Matiban

Zambezi system 
(gauge unknown) - line sabotaged during civil war, and later pulled up for scrap.
 Quelimane - river port
 Nicoadala
 Namacurra
 Naciaia
 Mocuba - terminus  (also called Vila de Mocuba)

(possible standard gauge)
 Tete - coal mines.
 Macuse - proposed coal export port.  Near Quelimane.

Central system 

( Zambezi valley )

 Beira - port
 Dondo - junction - cement works
 Muanza - limestone
 Inhaminga
 Inhamitanga - junction
 Caia - junction
 Vila de Sena - south side of bridge over Zambezi River
 Mutarara - north side of bridge - junction for  Malawi
  Charre
  Manica - border
  Mankhakwe, Malawi
 Kambulatsisi - junction
 Moatize - coal mines - railhead.

Proposed 
 Tete - branch extension and proposed coal mine
 Cheringoma - timber

 Mutarara - north side of bridge - junction for  Malawi
 Vila Nova da Fronteira - border with Malawi
  Nsanje

 Inhamitanga - junction
 Marromeu - branch terminus - sugar (82 km) - restored Sep 2008
 Valente

 Caia - junction
 Valente - branch terminus

 Machipanda - (317 km)

 Dondo - junction - cement works
  Chimoio
  Manica
  Mutare (Umtali before 1982), Zimbabwe - workshops
  Rusape

Southern system 

  Sango - border station
 Chicualacuala (formerly Malvernia)  - border with  Zimbabwe
 Mapai
 Guiga
 Manhiça
 Chokwé - way station
 Mabalane - way station
 Combomune - way station
 Mpuzi
 Magude - river crossing and junction
 Macarretane - river crossing
 Maputo - port - national capital
 Tenga - site of serious accident
 Muxia - junction
 Goba - to be restored 2008, on the border with  Eswatini
 Ressano Garcia - on the border with  South Africa
  Komatipoort - 90 km
 Matola - coal export port
 Salamanga  - branch terminus

Southeast 

 Xai-Xai - river port -  gauge
 Manjacaze - junction
 Maroa - terminus
 Chicome - branch terminus

Eastern 
(  gauge - defunct )
 Inhambane - port
 Inharrime - terminus

Approved 

 Matutuine - new coal port approved October 2009

Proposed 
 Tete - coal mining

 ( short-cut)
  Blantyre
  Moatize

 
 A local subsidiary of Kazakhstan-based Eurasian Natural Resources Corp has commissioned Mott MacDonald to undertake studies and is seeking expressions of interest in building a 1200 km line from Chiuta in Tete province to a new port at Nacala, bypassing Malawi. The line would be available to third parties, and a passenger service.  
 Moatize - coal
 Caia
 Quelimane
 Nacala - port

 Ludewa - coal
 Njombe - coal
 Mtwara - port in south

Possible 

  Serule, Botswana
  Techobanine deepwater port.

See also 

 Transport in Mozambique
 Railway stations in Malawi

References

Maps 
 UN Map
 UNHCR Altas Map (2005)
 Map Port Nacala railhead - shows line through Malawi to Chipata, Zambia.
 Southern Africa 
 Sena Railway

 
Railway stations
Railway stations